Heartland Community School is a public elementary and secondary education school located in Henderson, Nebraska, United States. Formerly known as Henderson Community School, its name was changed to encompass a school consolidation between Henderson and Bradshaw. The school has a total of 330 students.

Mission Statement 
The mission statement of Heartland Community School is, Heartland Community Schools-Henderson/Bradshaw strives to provide challenging educational opportunities for ALL students to reach their highest level of excellence.

Mid-century modern architecture and art 
Built in 1954, the school is an example of mid-century modern architecture. The entrance has a classic V-bar support and the exposed iron beams above the entry to the lobby. The entire lobby is host to the mural The Community Educates Its Children, painted in 1955 by Mary Lou Goertzen.

Controversy 
During the early 2009, a grassroots movement was started to save the mural. The school board canvassed the students and determined that the mid-century modern work was "outdated". While the mural was generating public support, it was disclosed that school board was considering "modernizing" the front entrance and lobby, in particular, considering replacement of the classic mid-century modern architecture, unique to rural Nebraska.

Extracurricular Activities 
Heartland Community schools offers a variety of extracurricular activities including basketball, football, volleyball, track and field, golf, drama, and FBLA.

Athletic State Championships 
Heartland Community schools teams won numerous state championships. The boys basketball team won the state championship in 1986 and 1984. In 1983, 1989, 2000 and 2002 the boys track and field team won the state championship. The football team won the state championship in 1981 and 1983.

Marching Band Awards 
The Heartland Community school's marching band led by Royce Schweitzer won Harvest of Harmony in 2013, 2014 and 2015.

References

External links
 

Public high schools in Nebraska
Schools in York County, Nebraska
School districts established in 1954